Body hopping is the ability and desire to possess people in quick succession. A body hopper can transfer quickly from one physical body to another physical body with little or no resistance and few conditions on moving on to a new body, and usually without getting stuck in said body for a long period of time. Although this idea is very unlikely, scientific studies suggest that this process would result in significant trauma.

Origin in fiction
This fictional occurrence can be seen in some media.  This popular scheme has been portrayed in a multitude of fantasy films and novels.  One of the earliest known examples of body swapping in literature is seen in the 1882 book Vice Versa by Thomas Antsey Guthrie, who wrote under the pseudonym F. Antsey in the 19th century.

Types

 Same-sex or same body type: people of the same biological sex and typically the same build swap bodies. (e.g. The Change-Up – both caucasian males above the age of 30)
 Different sex: people of different biological sexes that in turn swap bodies. (e.g. It's a Boy Girl Thing – two teenagers, one male and one female have to live in each other's bodies for a short period of time)
 Child-to-adult/adult-to-child: a child transforms into an adult body, vice versa. (e.g. Big – 12 year old boy turns into 30 year old man and must live an adult life with a real life job)
 Human to animal: humans turn into animal form. (e.g. Sabrina the Teenage Witch – their cat Salem was really once a boy who was cursed into living the rest of his life as a cat)

Examples  

 The Exorcist III 
 Fallen 
 The Hidden 
 Jason Goes to Hell: The Final Friday 
 Shocker
 The First Power
 Bone Dance

See also
 Demonic possession
 Spirit possession
 Exorcism
 Paranormal

References

Supernatural horror films
Fiction about spirit possession
Fiction about body swapping